Peerewal  is a village in Kapurthala district of Punjab State, India. The village is administrated by a Sarpanch, who is an elected representative.

Demography 
According to the report published by Census India in 2011, Peerewal has total number of 110 houses and population of 596 of which include 314 males and 282 females. Literacy rate of Peerewal is 73.99%, lower than state average of 75.84%.  The population of children under the age of 6 years is 100 which is 16.78% of total population of Peerewal, and child sex ratio is approximately 852, higher than state average of 846.

Population data

Air travel connectivity 
The closest airport to the village is Sri Guru Ram Dass Jee International Airport.

Villages in Kapurthala

References

External links
  Villages in Kapurthala
 Kapurthala Villages List

Villages in Kapurthala district